Fuaigh Beag or Vuia Be(a)g is an island in the Outer Hebrides. It is off the west coast of Lewis near Great Bernera in Loch Roag. Its name means "little Fuaigh", and is named in contrast to Fuaigh Mòr nearby.

History
The element "Fuaigh", derives from an Old Norse name.

Fuaigh Beag was cleared in 1827, and it has been uninhabited ever since.

Geography and geology

There are many skerries and small islands near it such as Geile Sgeir, Garbh Eilean, Eilean nam Feannag, Linngeam, Cliatasay, Gousam and yet another Floday.

See also

 List of islands of Scotland

Notes and references

Islands of Loch Ròg
Cleared places in the Outer Hebrides
Uninhabited islands of the Outer Hebrides